The AIC Serie B Young Footballer of the Year ( AIC) is a yearly award organized by the Italian Footballers' Association (AIC) given to the young footballer who has been considered to have performed the best over the previous Serie B season.

The award is part of the Gran Galà del Calcio (formerly known as Oscar del Calcio) awards event.

Winners

By club

By country

By position

References

External links
 List of Gran Galà del Calcio winners on the AIC official website

Awards established in 2011
Annual events in Italy
Serie B trophies and awards
Serie B players
Serie B
Association football player non-biographical articles